Lygophis anomalus is a species of snake in the family Colubridae.  The species is native to Brazil, Uruguay, Paraguay, and Argentina.

References

Lygophis
Snakes of South America
Reptiles of Brazil
Reptiles of Uruguay
Reptiles of Paraguay
Reptiles of Argentina
Reptiles described in 1858
Taxa named by Albert Günther